The Ministry of Lands and Natural Resources is a ministry in Zambia. It is headed by the Minister of Lands and Natural Resources.

In 2016 the Ministry of Lands, Natural Resources and Environmental Protection was split into the Ministry of Lands and Natural Resources and the Ministry of Water Development, Sanitation and Environmental Protection.

List of ministers

Deputy ministers

References

External links
Official website

Lands